Tyler Turner may refer:

 Tyler Turner (soccer), American soccer player
 Tyler Turner (snowboarder), Canadian para-snowboarder